Stewart McSweyn (born 1 June 1995) is an Australian long-distance runner. He competed in the Tokyo 2020 Olympics and managed to qualify for the Men's 1500m final. He came third in his heat with a time of 3:36.39 and qualified for the semifinals. Here he came fifth with a time of 3:32.54. This time was good enough for him to qualify for the final. His time of 3:31.91 earned him seventh place.

McSweyn also represented his country in the 3000 metres steeplechase at the 2017 World Championships. In April 2018, he represented Australia at the 2018 Commonwealth Games on the Gold Coast, Australia. He came 5th in the 5000m final and 11th in the 10,000m final. He was the first Australian in both events.

Early years 
McSweyn, grew up on a beef and sheep farm on King Island (population 1600) in the middle of Bass Strait, south of Melbourne, Victoria.

There was no high school on the island and he boarded at Ballarat in Victoria. Being away from home at a young age, he built resilience which helps him cope with being overseas for lengthy periods of time. Up until he was 14 years old he played cricket, tennis and AFL, but then decided to concentrate on athletics. At Ballarat he was coached by Rod Griffin, distance runner Collis Birmingham and his now training partner Brett Robinson. He represented Australia at the 2013 World Cross Country Championships in the junior race and in 2015 he ran the 5000m at the World University Games.

Professional career
In 2018, McSweyn placed third in both the 5000m and 3000m Steeplechase races at the Gold Coast Australian Championships in February. In April at the Commonwealth Games, McSweyn placed 5th in the 5000m final in 13:58.96 and 11th in the 10,000m final in 28:58.22 respectively.

At the Shanghai Diamond League meet, McSweyn placed 11th in 13:31.97 in the 5000m. He followed up with a 28:05.37 10,000m race at the Oslo Bislett Games in June and a 3:34.82 1500m in Germany nine days later.

McSweyn's next competition came at the Rabat Diamond League, where he placed third in a competitive 3000m field in 7:34.79. The time put him within two and a half seconds of Craig Mottram's Australian record in the event. He then raced in the London Müller Anniversary Games 5000m, finishing 12th in 13:20.21.

In August, McSweyn raced a mile at the Birmingham Müller Grand Prix, winning in 3:54.60. Five days later on August 23, he competed at the Rovereto Palio Città della Quercia in Italy, clocking 13:31.03 for 5000m. Eight days later at the Bruxelles Memorial van Damme Diamond League Final, McSweyn powered home to a 13:05.23 personal best over 5000m, finishing 12th in the race.

On September 9, he competed at the Ostrava IAAF Continental Cup in the 3000m. McSweyn finished 4th in 8:02.01.

McSweyn rounded out the year by winning his second straight Melbourne Zatopek:10. His 27:50.89 brought him his second straight Australian National Championship over 10,000m.

On Dec 14 2019, McSweyn broke the Australian record for 10,000m, running 27:23.80 at the Zatopek:10, his third successive national championship at the distance.

On July 2, 2021, McSweyn broke the Australian record for the mile, running 3:48.37, beating the record set by Craig Mottram in 2005 by 0.61 seconds.

International competitions

Personal bests

Track
1500 metres –  3:29.51 (Monaco Diamond League, 2021)
One mile – 3:48.37 (Oslo Diamond League, 2021)
3000 metres – 7:28.02 (Golden Gala, Rome 2020)
5000 metres – 12:56.50 (Brussels 2022)
10,000 metres – 27:23.38 (Zatopek 2019)
3000 metres steeplechase – 8:34.25 (Gothenburg 2017)
Road
5K run – 13:53 (Carlsbad 2017)
10K run – 28:03 (Burnie 2018)

References

1995 births
Living people
Sportsmen from Tasmania
Australian male long-distance runners
Australian male steeplechase runners
Commonwealth Games competitors for Australia
Athletes (track and field) at the 2018 Commonwealth Games
World Athletics Championships athletes for Australia
Australian Athletics Championships winners
Athletes (track and field) at the 2020 Summer Olympics
Olympic athletes of Australia
20th-century Australian people
21st-century Australian people